Luo Na (born 8 October 1993) is a Chinese hammer thrower. She competed in the women's hammer throw at the 2017 World Championships in Athletics.

International competitions

References

External links
 

1993 births
Living people
Chinese female hammer throwers
World Athletics Championships athletes for China
Place of birth missing (living people)
Athletes (track and field) at the 2018 Asian Games
Asian Games gold medalists for China
Asian Games medalists in athletics (track and field)
Medalists at the 2018 Asian Games
Asian Games gold medalists in athletics (track and field)
Athletes (track and field) at the 2020 Summer Olympics
Olympic athletes of China
20th-century Chinese women
21st-century Chinese women